American Latin pop duo Ha*Ash composed of sisters Ashley Grace and Hanna Nicole have released six studio albums, two live albums, two extended plays (EP), 36 singles (30 as a lead artist and 6 as a featured artist) and 10 promotional single.

They recorded their self-titled first album Ha*Ash with the Mexican producer Áureo Baqueiro in 2003. In April, they released their first single, "Odio Amarte". The second single was "Estés Donde Estés" which was released in 2003. The same year, a third single was released: the ballad "Te Quedaste". This was followed by their second album Mundos Opuestos again with Áureo Baqueiro. "Amor a Medias" was the first single and reached number four on the Mexican Chart in April 2006. The song was chosen to promote Sony's products. "Me Entrego a Ti" was the second single which was written by Colombian artist Soraya and had the same success.

Early 2008, they recorded their third album, Habitación Doble, in Nashville, Tennessee. This album have a collaboration of the singer Brandi Carlile with the song "Already Home", their first English song recorded by them (like officially). A Tiempo is the fourth studio album. It was released under the label Sony Music Latin on May 16, 2011. A Tiempo was recorded over a period of almost a year between Los Angeles, California and Milan, Italy. Ha*Ash worked with producer Áureo Baqueiro and invited Michele Canova.

After completing the tour for A Tiempo in 2013, it was revealed that Ha*Ash had begun production of the album Primera Fila: Hecho Realidad, which was released in 2014. Ha*Ash is the youngest group to record a Primera Fila concept album. The album includes material from her past four studio albums as well as 8 newly recorded songs. The CD/DVD has images from their hometown in Louisiana and a live concert filmed in Estudios Churubusco, Mexico City.

30 de Febrero was released on December 1, 2017, by Sony Music Latin. The album features artists with Prince Royce and Abraham Mateo on the title track. "100 Años" with Prince Royce was the first single and reached number one on the Mexican Chart in December 2017. On October 20, 2017, Ha*Ash released the video for the album's lead single. On December 6, 2019, the duo released a live album, entitled Ha*Ash: En Vivo, based on a recording from the concert at the Auditorio Nacional in Mexico on November 11, 2018.

Albums

Studio albums

Edition Deluxe

 Ha*Ash - Edition Deluxe DVD (July 19, 2004) – AMPROFON: Platinum (sales: 150,000).

Live albums

Extended plays

Singles

As lead artist

Promotional singles

As featured artist

Other songs

Guest appearances

Soundtracks

See also 
 Ha*Ash videography
 List of songs recorded by Ha*Ash

References

Footnotes
Notes for albums and songs

Notes for peak chart positions

Citations

External links
 
 
 Ha*Ash discography at Genius
 
 

Discography
Discographies of American artists
Discographies of Mexican artists
Latin pop music discographies